Hemideina crassidens, commonly known as the Wellington tree wētā, is a large, flightless, nocturnal insect in the family Anostostomatidae. This wētā species is endemic to New Zealand and populates regions in the southern half of North Island/Te Ika a Maui and the north-west of the South Island/Te Wai Pounamu. They forage arboreally during the night and are most likely polyphagous. There is obvious sexual dimorphism in adults. Individuals are reliant on tree cavities for refuge, social interactions and mating.

The conservation status of H. crassidens is "not threatened".

Distribution and habitat 
Hemideina crassidens is endemic to New Zealand. Populations are distributed between the Ruapehu district and Wellington district of the North Island, and in the  Westland district of the South Island. A closely related native tree wētā, Hemideina thoracica, is widely distributed in the northern two-thirds of the North Island New Zealand. It has been suggested that H thoracica competitively excludes H. crassidens from warmer northern regions of the North Island. On Mt Taranaki, H. crassidens is found only at elevations above ~700 m asl, and H. thoracica is found lower down the slopes where temperatures are slightly warmer.

Hemideina crassidens is a nocturnal and arboreal. This species uses holes in tree branches to hide during the day. They usually live in tree holes, suggesting a reliance on forest. However, many extant tree wētā populations occupy scrub habitats or even use rock refuges when trees are not available.

Climate change 
In the central North Island populations of H. crassidens have become isolated within areas mostly populated by H. thoracica suggesting previous range contraction due to interactions with competitors and the environment. This contraction is likely to continue southwards during global warming, resulting in the displacement of H. crassidens from many lowland areas of central and southern North Island.

Diet 
Being a tree wētā, H. crassidens spend most of their time foraging arboreally. They are generally herbivorous, feeding on the leaves, fruit and flowers of a wide range of trees and shrubs. However, polyphagy is common among wētā species and it is likely that H. crassidens supplement their diet with animal matter. Individuals have been documented feeding on living or recently dead invertebrates.

Morphology 

Hemideina crassidens are relatively large at maturity (> 6.5 cm body length). Their bodies are smooth and shiny, the abdomen is ringed with contrasting bands of dark brownish to black and yellow, with a pale underside. This colouration is reminiscent of uniform of the Wellington rugby team, the Hurricanes, and can be used to distinguish it from the Auckland tree wētā (Hemideina thoracica). They have heavily spined hind tibiae that are used in defence postures. The antennae are long and mobile to help with sensing and navigation, particularly in the dark. The Wellington tree wētā and the Hawkes Bay tree wētā (Hemideina trewicki) look the same but have different numbers of chromosomes. In South Island H. crassidens have 19 (male) or 20 (female) chromosomes and in North Island this species has 15 or 16 chromosomes. The Hawkes Bay tree wētā has 17 (male) or 18 (female) chromosomes.

Sexual dimorphism
Males display highly exaggerated, positively allometric mandibles. Accelerated maturation of males gives rise to three different head sizes that correlate their maturation on either the 8th, 9th or 10th instar. 8th instar males have small heads, 10th instar males have particularly elongated jaws and a large vertex and 9th instar males have an intermediate from. Females only reach maturity at the 10th instar. In this wētā species, females can be identified by their small head and long ovipositor.

Galleries 

Rather than bore their own tree holes, H. crassidens inhabit natural crevices and cavities, or pre-existing tunnels that have been excavated by large wood-boring larva such as Aenetus virescens (Lepidoptera: Hepoalidae). They prefer tree holes in living timber and avoid fallen or rotten logs. Native trees and shrubs such manuka (Leptospermum scoparium), kanuka (Kunzea ericoides), ngaio (Myoporum laetum), kohekohe (Dysoxylum spectabile) and mahoe (Melicytus ramiflorus) are favoured by H. crassidens. Suitable galleries have a narrow entrance hole (~20mm in diameter) in order to provide protection from predators such as birds. The holes are entered head first and exited in reverse so that the spines on their hind tibiae point outwards to defend from intruders. Inhabited galleries can often be identified by the neatly nibbled entrance which is kept clean. Individuals often occupy the same gallery for an extended period of time. Galleries buffer against environmental variation, especially humidity.

Breeding 
Hemideina crassidens is a polygynous insect in which males guard females that reside in tree cavities termed 'galleries'. Galleries are used for breeding and males compete for control of them and access to the females within. Male head size is an indicator of combative ability as the head is used as weaponry in combat for dominance and control of a harem. In cases where the gallery is sufficiently large, multiple males can occupy a single gallery, suggesting that a dominant male defends a harem rather than a gallery per se. Males can avoid combat by facing off, opening their jaws and assessing the gape of their opponent's mandibles. In a non-violent contest the male whose mandibles span the furthest is considered dominant. Small headed males can mate by wandering nocturnally and copulating with females outside of a gallery, or by sneaking into a gallery occupied by a dominant male and copulating with females within. A small headed male is able to control a harem within a gallery if the entrance is too small for large headed males to fit through.

Most matings and ovipositions occur over the summer and autumn. Females lay their eggs vertically in the soil approximately 10mm under the surface. Hatching occurs in spring and individuals take about 18 months to become mature, reaching sexual maturity in the following summer. Hemideina crassidens do not show any parental care. Their normal lifespan is about 3 years, with about 18 months as immatures.

Conservation 
The number of suitable galleries in an area is considered to be a major limiting resource of H. crassidens. The construction and distribution of artificial refuges has been suggested as a possible conservation strategy to try and increase populations of H. crassidens and H. thoracica.

The conservation status of H. crassidens is "not threatened".

References

External links 

Weta
Insects described in 1851
Anostostomatidae
Taxa named by Émile Blanchard